The Archbishop of Sydney is the diocesan bishop of the Anglican Diocese of Sydney, Australia and ex officio metropolitan bishop of the ecclesiastical Province of New South Wales.

From 1814 to 1836 the colony of New South Wales was part of the Diocese of Calcutta. In 1836, the Diocese of Australia was formed and the first bishop of Australia enthroned.  By letters patent of 25 June 1847, the Diocese of Australia was split into their four dioceses, one of which being the Diocese of Sydney and its bishop the Bishop of Sydney. The Diocese of Sydney has been led by an archbishop since 1897. Since the first creation of another province within Australia in 1905, the archbishop has also been ex officio metropolitan of the Province of New South Wales.

The archbishop of Sydney is currently assisted by five regional assistant bishops.

On 6 May 2021, Kanishka Raffel, Dean of St Andrew's Cathedral, Sydney since 4 February 2016, was elected as the next archbishop.

List of Bishops and Archbishops of Sydney

Notes

References

External links

Sydney Anglicans – official site

 
Lists of Anglican bishops and archbishops
Anglican bishops of Sydney